The 2011–12 Nebraska Cornhuskers men's basketball team represented the University of Nebraska-Lincoln. The head coach was Doc Sadler, in his sixth season with the Cornhuskers. The team played their home games in Bob Devaney Sports Center in Lincoln, Nebraska, and were first-year members of the Big Ten Conference. They finished with a record of 12–18 overall, 4–14 in Big Ten play. They lost in the first round by Purdue of the 2012 Big Ten Conference men's basketball tournament. It was later announced in March 2012 that head coach Doc Sadler was fired.

Incoming Recruits

Roster

Schedule 

|-
!colspan=9| Exhibition
|-

|-
!colspan=9| Regular season
|-

|-
!colspan=9| Big Ten tournament
|-

References

Nebraska
Nebraska Cornhuskers men's basketball seasons
Nebraska Cornhuskers men's basketball
Nebraska Cornhuskers men's basketball